The Swansea Deanery is a Roman Catholic deanery in the Diocese of Menevia that covers several churches in Swansea and the surrounding area.

The dean is centred at St Joachim & St Anne's Church in Swansea.

Churches
 St David's Priory Church, Swansea
 St Benedict, Clydach
 Sacred Heart, Ystradgynlais - served from Clydach
 Sacred Heart, Morriston
 St Peter Church, Landore
 Holy Cross, Gendros
 St Joachim and St Anne, Dunvant 
 St Illtyd, St Thomas
 St Benedict, Sketty
 Our Lady Star of the Sea Church, Mumbles
 Our Lady of Lourdes, Townhill
 St Joseph's Cathedral, Swansea

Gallery

References

External links
 Diocese of Menevia site
 Cathedral Church of Saint Joseph site
 St David's Priory website
 St David's Priory site
 Sacred Heart Parish Ystradgynlais site
 Sacred Heart Parish Morriston site
 St Joachim & St Anne Parish Dunvant site

Roman Catholic Deaneries in the Diocese of Menevia